Morley Candy Company or Morley Candy Makers is a confectioner based in Clinton Township, Michigan. The company, founded in 1919, is famous for its peanut butter blocks and assorted chocolates. Morley Candy owns and markets the Sanders Confectionery line, which is famous for its Bumpy Cakes, sundae topping, and ice cream, particularly in and around Detroit, Michigan. Michigan school children often sell Morley Candy for school fundraisers.

In May 2004, Ronald Rapson became president of Morley Brands LLC.

There are three Morley Candy retail stores in the Metro Detroit area—Clinton Township, Rochester, and Eastpointe.

On October 26, 2006, President George W. Bush made an unannounced visit to Morley's main factory on Hall Road in Clinton Township before attending a political fundraiser.  After touring the facility, he bought, amongst other things, a can of Sanders hot fudge sundae topping for himself and his presidential staff.

Kar's Nuts acquired Morley in 2018. The Morley brand is no longer widely used.

References

External links
Morley Candy Makers
Sanders Candy

Confectionery companies of the United States
Companies based in Macomb County, Michigan
1919 establishments in Michigan
Food and drink companies established in 1919